Hip Hip Hurray is an Indian television series created and directed by Nupur Asthana that first aired on Zee TV channel from 21 August 1998 to 25 May 2001.

Plot
The story is based on the lives of 12th-grade students at the DeNobili High School and their adventures, their fears and hopes, and their relationships and interactions. Besides that, the story also focuses on issues pertinent for the younger generation such as dating, drugs, careers, health, exams, and causes, in a light-hearted manner. The first season of the series more focused on the stars where they were in school flitting through life with joys and sorrows of life as students. It contained eighty episodes.

Cast 
Nilanjana Sharma as Mona
Pamela Mukherjee as Bela
Rushad Rana as Raghav
Bhumika Chawla/Preeti Narayan/Nauheed Cyrusi as Meera
Sharukh Barucha as Cyrus
Purab Kohli as Mazhar
Zafar Karachiwalla as Rafey
Candida Fernandes as Alisha
Mehul Nisar as Mehul
Samantha Tremayne as Samantha
Shweta Salve/Kuljeet Randhawa as Prishita
Peeya Rai Chowdhary as Kiran
Yogesh Pagare as Manjeet
Vishal Malhotra as John
Kishwer Merchant as Nonie
Manish Goel as a student (not a main character but seen in the initial episodes of the serial along with others)
Beena Banerjee as Ms. Rodriguez
Suchitra Pillai as Alaknanda ma'am
Kenneth Desai as Yadav Sir
Vinay Pathak as Vincent George (Vinnie Sir)
Sanjay Mishra as Chandragupta Sir
Vicky Ahuja as Bhoolu Dada
Mohan Kapoor as Criminal
Girish Jain as Avinash
Jitandra Trehan as Ghanshyam [Episode 61] (Retd. Army Officer)
Dharampal Thakur as Inspector
Smita Hai as Doctor
Ankush Mohla as Vishal
Sulbha Arya as Mrs. Sharma (Hindi teacher)
Utkarsh Mazumdar as Hussain Sir (Chemistry teacher) (special appearance in CID ep 4 as the owner of the house)
Sheeba Chaddha as Karuna Madam (Biology Teacher)
Mita Vashisht as L. Bannerjee [Episode 38,39 &40] (replacement English teacher)
Atul Kumar Mittal Teacher 
Milind Soman as himself in Episode 71
Achint Kaur as Maya in episodes 73 and 74
Shabbir Ahluwalia Purab: Prishita's brother in Episode 34
Ragesh Asthana as Mr. Chowdhary: Kiran's father
Ruchi Rakhanpal as Mrs. Chowdhary: Kiran's mother
Shishir Sharma Mr. Joshi: Mona's father
Anita Kanwal as Mrs. Barucha: Cyrus's mother
Seema Pahwa as Mrs. Merchant: Mazhar's Mother
Pavan Malhotra as Mr. Bhatia

Episodes

Episode 1: All the students are extremely excited about coming back to school after the vacations especially the 12th-grade students as this is their last year in DeNobili high school. A new student named Alisha arrives in the class. Everyone dislikes Alisha because of her tantrums and taunt her all the time for it. Alisha feels dejected and misses her previous school. Alisha hates DeNobili and decides to get herself expelled from the school.

Episode 2: Alisha strives to be expelled from the school. She vandalises the school library and laboratory and even fights with other students. All the students complain against her and the principal of the school calls up her parents. The principal informs Alisha's parents about her behavior and they tell her as to why they had to shift Alisha to this school. Alisha breaks down as she overhears her parents speaking to the principal about the financial crisis they are going through because of which they could not continue Alisha's schooling in her previous school. Alisha repents her behavior.

Episode 3: Alisha realizes her mistake and apologizes to everyone for her behavior. But no one is ready to accept her. Alisha feels dejected and tries her best to convince everyone. Rafey befriends Alisha and finally, she is forgiven by one and all. Alisha too fondly becomes a part of DeNobili. A student named Manjeet suddenly faints.

Episode 4: Everyone is chilling out at Kiran's house when Manjeet's father calls up and asks him to come back home. Manjeet's father is worried for him and doubts that he has got into bad company. Rafey, Mona, Kiran, Cyrus and John go out to have Pizza. They all get stunned on seeing Mazhar working as a waiter there. Everyone is pretty cool with Mazhar's part-time job but Kiran overreacts and feels shameful about the fact that her best friend is working as a waiter.

Episode 5: Kiran is very upset with Mazhar for hiding this truth from her. Mazhar too feels sad as some of his friends make fun of him, some pity him while some feel shameful about the fact that he is working as a waiter. But Mazhar's mom makes him understand that he should be proud of the fact that he is working so that he can bear the expenses of his education. Gradually everyone including Kiran understands him. Kiran and Mazhar sort out their misunderstandings. Everyone is worried because of Manjeet's sudden change in behavior.

Episode 6: All the students notice that some money has been missing from their bags. Everyone misunderstands Meera as she gives a treat to all which generally she never does. Everyone is unaware of the fact that it is Meera's birthday. Even her best friend Prishita misunderstands her. Without knowing the complete truth, everyone starts blaming and taunting Meera and she is completely dejected. Meera reveals all the truth to Vincent Sir who is the favorite of all the students. Vincent Sir makes everyone realize their mistake and they all feel guilty for their behavior towards Meera. Everyone apologizes to Meera and celebrate her birthday together.

Episode 7: It's a rainy day and all students make the most of it by playing football in the rain. Even some teachers join them in the fun. The students come across a little boy named Gittu who is the son of Bholu Dada a peon of DeNobili. Gittu too desires to study in DeNobili high school. But the management does not permit this. All the teachers and students get together and make efforts to get Gittu admitted in the school. Gittu gets admission in DeNobili.

Episode 8: All the students make a plan to trap the person who steals money from their bags. Everyone gets stunned when they catch Manjeet red-handed. Vincent Sir and Alakhnanda ma'am get tensed on knowing this and try to figure out the reason behind Manjeet's behavior. Everyone gets very hurt and boycott Manjeet.

Episode 9: Everyone confronts Manjeet and he feels dejected as no one talks to him. He tries in vain to speak to them and even apologizes to them all. Manjeet collapses in the toilet because of a drug overdose. Everyone gets stunned on knowing that Manjeet has been taking drugs for quite some time now. Manjeet is sent for rehabilitation and his father decides to leave the town once he gets well. Vinny (Vincent) Sir tells everyone about the after-effects of drugs. All his friends talk to Vinny Sir and decide to support Manjeet so that he can come out clean and lead a normal life.

Episode 10: Raghav becomes the sports captain and is in charge of the junior football team. Raghav is extremely thrilled but behaves very sternly with the juniors and makes them practice for long hours. Raghav starts ignoring everything after becoming the captain. His classmates censure his regime and he confronts them all. Everyone gets bothered by his behavior but the Principal tries to make him understand that he needs to mellow down or else he'll lose the captainship.

Episode 11: Rafey replaces Raghav as the sports captain. Raghav's younger brother Rajiv accuses him of being a bully. Rajiv's words make a strong impact on Raghav and he realizes his mistake. Raghav gets the position of the sports captain once again. Raghav and the entire team of juniors work very hard and win the basketball tournament. Entire DeNobili High celebrates the success in full swing.

Episode 12: Rafey is an orphan and lives with his uncle and aunt. Though he bonds very well with his little cousin Rahil, his aunt does not like him much. Rafey's aunt does not want him to stay in their house and hence keeps bothering him. One day Rafey's aunt throws him out of the house for his small mistake. Rafey is left without a roof over his head. Rafey tries calling Vinny Sir for help but he is unavailable. Rafey then calls up Alakhnanda ma'am. Rafey stays with Alakhnanda and her fiancé Vishal overnight.

Episode 13: Rafey discusses his problem with his friends and teachers. Everyone lends their support towards him. His uncle comes to meet him in school where Vinny Sir and Alakhnanda mam make him understand that they should let Rafey take his own decision. Rafey tells his uncle that he holds no grudges against his aunt but he desires to live on his own so that he can become responsible. Rafey and his friends together search for accommodation for him. Finally, Rafey gets accommodation at his art teacher Chandragupta Sir's place. Rafey's aunt apologizes to him and asks him to come back home but he refuses to change his decision.

Episode 14: All the students prepare for the parade of Republic Day. This year the 12th class students decide to do something different and special. They all strongly feel that they should do something for elderly people. Hence, with the help of their teachers, they visit an old age home and arrange a special program for them on Republic Day. They all together bring smiles to the faces of many aged people.

Episode 15: The students are informed about an art exhibition and that whoever wins the competition will get a scholarship to study arts in Paris. Bela is very fond of painting and desires to take part in the competition. But her parents do not permit her. Bela does not give up and with the help of Chandragupta Sir she creates an excellent work of art. Chandragupta Sir prepares Bela for the competition but is unaware that her parents have not given her permission yet.

Episode 16: Bela feels dejected as her parents refuse to grant her permission to take part in the art competition. Chandragupta Sir signs the entry form as Bela's guardian. Bela is extremely nervous but all her friends stand by her. Finally, Bela and Chandragupta Sir's hard work pays off and Bela wins the art competition. Everyone is extremely happy and proud of Bela.

Episode 17: Kiran dislikes her mother's jovial and friendly behavior towards her friends. Kiran gets extremely bothered whenever her friends talk nicely about her mother or praise her. Kiran faces strange insecurity and because of this, she fails to understand her mother's love towards her.

Episode 18: Kiran starts behaving strangely. She is depressed and stays aloof from everyone. Kiran eats a lot of junk food and then throws up. Her friends notice this but fail to understand her behavior. Rafey and Alisha confess their feelings to each other on Valentine's Day. Everyone is celebrating Valentine's Day when Kiran suddenly collapses.

Episode 19: Kiran's father tries to talk to her but in vain. Mona and Mazhar find out the reason behind Kiran's strange behavior. Kiran seems to suffer from a psychological disease named anorexia. Vinny Sir calls up Kiran's father but he speaks rudely to him. Kiran's parents have an argument. Mazhar takes Kiran to a psychiatrist but she runs away from there. Vinny Sir convinces Kiran to visit the psychiatrist once again. This time Kiran bursts open in front of the doctor.

Episode 20: Kiran feels much better after speaking to the psychiatrist and she comes back to normal. Alaknanda mam invites all the 12th class students for the Holi party at her place. Everyone plays Holi with Alaknanda and her fiancé Vishal. John really admires Alaknanda mam and feels uncomfortable on seeing her and Vishal together. Vishal gets shocked as Alaknanda informs him that she is pregnant and he asks her to go for an abortion.

Episode 21: Vishal tells Alaknanda that he is not ready to get married while Alaknanda refuses to abort the child. Everyone starts gossiping about Alaknanda's pregnancy and all the parents raise an objection over it. The parents of all students feel that Alaknanda is morally wrong but the principal and other teachers support Alaknanda's decision.

Episode 22: Unavailable

Episode 23: Unavailable

Episode 24: Alisha feels jealous as Rafey gives much attention to Noni. On seeing Noni in regular clothes, everyone debates whether or not uniforms should be compulsory. Class 12 students go for a picnic to Esselworld. After the debate, everyone decides to wear casual clothes for the picnic and not the uniforms - but, to everyone's surprise, Noni comes in uniform. Alisha feels disturbed as Rafey completely ignores her and runs behind Noni.

Episode 25: Everyone enjoys the picnic. Alisha breaks down and Mazhar confronts her and tries to talk to Rafey as he, too, feels hurt by Rafey's behavior. But Rafey asks Mazhar to stay out of it. Noni is irritated by all this and tries to speak to Alisha. Rafey tells Alisha that she is overreacting to the whole issue. Alisha is extremely hurt and breaks her relationship with Rafey.

Episode 26: Everyone learns about Rafey and Alisha's break up. After the picnic, all the girls plan a night out at Mona's place. Noni clarifies all the misunderstandings with Alisha and tells her that she was never attracted to Rafey and instead she loves Mazhar. All the girls are having fun when the boys suddenly arrive. Rafey tries in vain to apologize to Alisha. Mazhar and Noni too confess their feelings to each other. The girls expel the boys from the house.

Episode 27: Mehul feels sad because he is ridiculed for being fat and not having a girlfriend. He then lies to everyone that he has a girlfriend named Shalini. But Mehul gets into trouble as everyone desires to meet Shalini. He keeps lying to all about Shalini. One day he meets Nikki and she agrees to go for a movie with him. Mehul is delighted.

Episode 28: The girls form a group called "Hells Angels" and start a mission to maintain the cleanliness of their surroundings and to improve society. The boys laugh at their mission and ridicule them. But the girls do not give in. Their first mission is to collect all the street puppies and search a home for them. They all land in trouble but somehow manage to complete their mission. Their next mission is an anti-smoking campaign. But Mona and Kiran argue over the issue of who will be at centre stage in the dance performance for the anti-smoking campaign.

Episode 29: Mona and Kiran continue with their tiff and try to prove who is better than the other. The gang of girls succeeds in their paper-recycling drive. Finally, Mona and Kiran resolve their misunderstandings and collaborate on the anti-smoking campaign which succeeds because of their joint effort.

Episode 30: The gang of girls comes across some street kids who peddle merchandise at the signals. "Hells Angels" decide to stop child labor and start a literacy campaign "Each One Teach One". Students of DeNobili High teach many street kids to give them a good life. They also notice the hidden talents in some kids and encourage them to do even better.

Episode 31: Mona informs everyone that a new TV set is going to be installed in the school. Mona also informs everyone that they will be making in a new TV show which will be by the students and for the students. John and Mona are made in charge of the TV show. John and Mona fall in love with each other. But while discussing the TV show John and Mona have a heated argument and Mona walks off.

Episode 32: Prishita is super excited for the auditions to be the host for the TV show. John asks Samantha as well to take part in the auditions. Prishita thoroughly prepares for the auditions but is unaware of the fact that even Samantha is taking part in it. Prishita is surprised to learn that both she and Samantha have been shortlisted for the final audition. Prishita is infuriated and feels betrayed by Samantha. Mona and John again quarrel and Mona behaves rudely to him. John breaks down and Rafey tries to make Mona realize her mistake.

Episode 33: Samantha apologizes to Prishita and tells her that she didn't intend to hurt her. Prishita humiliates Samantha and calls her a loser. Samantha gets furious and takes up the challenge. Prishita induces Raghav to leak all the information about the auditions to her. Prishita comes fully prepared while Samantha does everything spontaneously. John and Mona resolve their misunderstandings and get back together.

Episode 34: Despite of all the preparations of Prishita, Samantha wins the auditions on the basis of her spontaneity. Prishita accepts her defeat gracefully and patches up with Samantha. Cyrus and entire class plan to play a trick with their Hindi teacher Mrs. Sharma. Prishita feels hurt as no one reveals about the trick to her because of her bigmouthed nature. Their trick to trouble Mrs. Sharma becomes successful but Yadav Sir learns about it. Yadav Sir punishes the whole class with a surprise test. At first Prishita is not ready to bear the punishment as she was not a part of the trick but later she understands and starts preparing for the test. Prishita's brother Purab tells her a trick to pass in the examination.

Episode 35 Samantha and Kiran catch Prishita red-handed while cheating but do not reveal about it to the teachers and make Prishita understand the value of friendship. All the boys bunk school and watch Cricket World Cup at John's house. All of them are stunned when John's mother enters suddenly. She is infuriated by the chaos and mayhem. John's mother is pregnant and they all panic when she starts getting labor pains. They take her to the hospital. John's mother gives birth to a cute daughter and John is overjoyed.

Episode 36: Everyone watches the screening of their TV show together and get emotional when they see Manjeet's anti-drug message in it. Cyrus and John get into a brawl with some students of the other school St. Xaviers and run away from there. Next day in class John and Cyrus try to show off and lie to all that they battered the boys of St. Xaviers but their lie is short-lived as Bela reveals all the truth. Bela learns the whole story through her cousin Shekhar who was one of the men who attacked John and Cyrus. Shekhar and Bela are at Pizza express and all the DeNobili students too come there. Raghav and Shekhar come to blows and Shekhar challenges Raghav for a cricket match. Everyone blames Bela for being supportive of Shekhar. Everyone gets ready for the cricket match.

Episode 37: Finally the day of the cricket match arrives. Students of Xaviers play very foul and even cheat to win the match. Shekhar pushes Rafey to get his wicket. But students of DeNobili don't lose their dignity and play with full sportsmanship. DeNobili loses the match but live up to their decorum. Bela supports her school in the match and tells Shekhar that she is ashamed of him as he has won the match by cheating.

Episode 38: A new teacher named L. Bannerjee comes to teach English in place of Vinny Sir for a few weeks as Vinny is down with malaria. Miss Bannerjee is a poetess and Kiran and Nonie are in awe of Miss L. Bannerjee. Nonie finds out that her name is Lavanya. Miss Bannerjee is very stern and no one else apart from Kiran and Nonie likes her. Lavanya gets upset as the publishers refuse to publish her new poems. Nonie writes a poem to impress Lavanya. But Lavanya does not like it and says it straightforwardly. Nonie gets irritated as everyone makes fun of her poems.

Episode 39: Kiran and Nonie get into an ugly competition in trying to impress Miss Bannerjee. But they just make a fool of themselves. Nonie writes a poem again but feels depressed as no one is keen on hearing it. She feels hurt as even her idol Miss Bannerjee writes her off as a bad poet. Nonie does not give up and decides to write a poem again and get back to her. Things have not pacified yet between Nonie and Kiran and she tells Kiran that Miss Bannerjee's real name is Lata and not Lavanya.

Episode 40: Noni blames Kiran of having poisoned Miss Bannerjee against her. Miss Bannerjee insults Noni in the class and tells her that her poem is pathetic. Noni makes it clear that she had copied the poem from some book and it was written by some famous poet. Miss Bannerjee feels disgusted and leaves the class. Vinny Sir who was also present in the class goes to meet Miss Bannerjee and makes her understand that she should not demoralize any student. Miss Bannerjee realizes her mistake and bids farewell to DeNobili. Kiran and Noni also patch up with each other.

Episode 41: Cyrus along with Mehul goes to one of his mother's friend's house where he meets her daughter Sharon who has Down Syndrome. Cyrus and gang find out about a special school for such children. Cyrus makes Sharon's mother understand that she should be sent to this school so that she gets a chance to evolve. She agrees and Cyrus and his group of friends get her admitted in Dilkhush School for special children. They all get emotional on seeing the mentally challenged kids and desire to do something for them. All of them with the help of the school staff organize a special program where these kids display their talents.

Episode 42: Everyone gets shocked as Vinny gives the monthly report card. John is scolded by his father for flunking mathematics. Everyone is worried about their marks and John suggests that they should join coaching classes. Everyone joins coaching classes and then they are not able to give time towards their literacy campaign. Mona and Rafey get irritated by this and tell them they cannot ignore the literacy campaign like this. Mona and Rafey discover that the coaching classes fleece students for money and decide to expose them.

Episode 43: Mona and Rafey inform the teachers about the coaching classes racket. Mrs. Rodriquez holds a parent-teacher meeting to alert the parents to it. Aware, everyone quits the coaching classes. Mona's father and Mrs. Rodriquez befriend each other and Mona is upset as everyone starts teasing her for this. Everyone discusses the Kargil war as Mrs. Rodriquez' son Mike is a captain in the Indian Army.

Episode 44: Mona feels uncomfortable seeing her father and Principal Mrs. Rodriquez together. Independence Day is celebrated at DeNobili High. Vinny Sir discusses Shakespeare's famous play Othello and it makes a strong impact on Mona.

Episode 45: Mona is infuriated as everyone is gossiping about her father and the Principal. Mrs. Rodriquez reminds Mona about the cleanliness drive. Mona does not complete her work and behaves rudely with Mrs. Rodriquez for which she is punished. Mona's father and Mrs. Rodriguez get worried and fail to understand Mona's behavior.

Episode 46: Mona finds it difficult to deal with the bonding between her father and Mrs. Rodriquez. Mona becomes hostile to her father. Mona's father tries in vain to make her understand. Mrs. Rodriquez gets the news that her son Mike has died in the war. Mona's father goes for the funeral and Mona follows him. Mona breaks down on knowing about Mike's death.

Episode 47: Everyone feels sad about Mike's death. Mona feels guilty for her misbehavior and apologizes to Mrs. Rodriguez. Mrs. Rodriquez and Mona mend their relationship. Mrs. Rodriquez explains to Mona that she and her father are only companions. Rafey is upset to see Alisha with Raghav. Kiran informs everyone about a dance night in DeNobili in which St. Xavier's students will attend.

Episode 48: Everyone gears up for the dance night. Mazhar has no money to buy a brand new suit to take Nonie out on the dance night. John suggests Mazhar earn quick money through some scheme. Mazhar becomes a sales representative of some Japan-based company named Tofu Glo and sells all its products to his friends. He even earns money but has to give back the money when the products he has sold do not turn out to be good. All his friends make his life miserable after using the products and ask him to return all their money.

Episode 49: Everyone prepares for the dance night and come to the party with their respective partners. John and Mona while Mazhar and Nonie dance together. Rafey feels dejected on seeing Alisha dancing with Raghav. John tries to cheer up Rafey.

Episode 50: Everyone is having fun in the dance night. Finally, Rafey and Alisha talk their hearts out to each other and solve all their misunderstandings. Rafey apologizes to Alisha and even confesses his love to her. Alisha too admits her feelings for him. They all dance the night away.

Episode 51: Yadav Sir scolds Cyrus for inattentiveness mathematics class. Cyrus makes a plan and along with John escapes from the school complaining about stomach pain. Cyrus and John bunk school and go to watch a film. Cyrus calls up John and the next day again plans to bunk school and go to the water kingdom. Cyrus meets a girl named Anuradha at the water kingdom and falls in love with her. John dislikes this as the girl is much older than Cyrus.

Episode 52: John tries to make Cyrus understand that he should not lie and bunk from school to meet his girlfriend Anuradha. Cyrus has lied to Anuradha that he studies in college. John and Cyrus have a tiff and get into a brawl over this. As Cyrus misses school for eight days, his Hindi teacher Mrs. Sharma calls his mother. Cyrus's mother is surprised to hear that Cyrus has not gone to school for the past many days. Cyrus even lies to his mother when she questions him about it. But one day finally Anuradha discovers the truth. Anuradha maturely handles the situation and makes Cyrus understand that they cannot be together because of their age difference but they can always be friends.

Episode 53: Kiran gets a nightmare that she has got up late and rushes to school. When Kiran reaches school everyone is in a role reversal as Yadav Sir behaves like Vinny Sir and vice versa. Mehul behaves like a cool dude and all girls throng him. Cyrus behaves like a geek while Rafey is behaving like Mehul. Kiran faints with a shock when she sees that peon Bholu has become the principal of their school. Finally, Kiran wakes up and finds that all this was a nightmare. Kiran gets elated as she reaches school and finds everything normal.

Episode 54: Vinny Sir informs everyone that he has been offered a job by the UNO and has to settle in Kenya for two years. Everyone gets very excited about knowing this but at the same time feels extremely sad as they do not wish to part from Vinny Sir. Everyone tries their best to stop him but in vain. Vinny is passionate about teaching and does not want to lose this opportunity. Alakhnanda too tries to convince Vinny and he tells her that even he is feeling terrible to part from DeNobili.

Episode 55: Everyone is very emotional to part from Vinny Sir. But they all get pleasantly surprised as Vinny Sir informs them that he is not leaving them and DeNobili. Meera and Prishita are best friends but Prishita and everyone else finds Meera very boring. Meera feels very dejected by this.

Episode 56: Meera's grandfather gets a computer for her. Meera gets addicted to internet chatting. Meera regularly chats with a guy whose screen name is Cool Dude. Chatting makes an adverse effect on Meera's studies and she even has a spat with Prishita. Meera gets really worried when the guy insists on meeting her. Meera is very scared but finally agrees to meet him.

Episode 57: Prishita and Meera resolve their misunderstandings. Meera understands that Prishita is her best friend. Meera tries to convince Prishita to meet Cool Dude on her behalf. But Meera gets a shock of her life as Cool Dude comes in school to meet her. Meera doesn't reveal her true identity to him. Meera gets shocked by seeing his appearance and her along with Prishita fools him. Teachers organize a special play for all the students on Children's Day and surprise them all.

Episode 58: All the girls prove to the boys that they are not weak by beating up Rafey and John. Kiran and other girls make a plan to try smoking cigarettes in the storeroom of the school. They all succeed in their plan but suddenly they get a shock of their life. A gangster named Rajan who was hiding in the storeroom holds Nonie at his gunpoint. They all are horrified.

Episode 59: The gangster Rajan holds the girls as hostages, and when Rafey barges in, he too is held captive. Vinny Sir understands that something is fishy. He along with peon Bholu tries to get inside the storeroom but does not succeed. Rafey manages to open the door of the storeroom but he gets hit by Rajan's bullet on his arm. Vinny Sir calls up the police. Rajan sends Rafey out to inform about his demands to the police. Rafey informs the police that Rajan needs some cash and a vehicle to escape from there or he will kill the girls whom he has held hostages.

Episode 60: Police try to enter the storeroom through the window but fail in their plan to save the girls. All the girls are still horrified. Finally, the police accept his demands and ask him to free the girls. Rajan releases all the other girls but holds Samantha at his gunpoint and tries to escape. Police are ready with their plan to catch Rajan but Samantha cleverly handles the situation. Samantha pretends to faint and suddenly grabs Rajan's gun. Rajan is arrested by the police and no one is hurt.

Episode 61: Samantha's parents worry about her and appoint a bodyguard for her. Samantha gets irritated by this. She tries her best to get rid of him but in vain. All her friends make fun of this. Samantha firmly tells her parents that she doesn't need a bodyguard. Samantha succeeds in dodging the bodyguard and goes to watch a film with her friends. Samantha gets a scolding from her mother for doing so. Samantha feels guilty for her behavior when she learns that her bodyguard Ghanshyam has served in the Indian Military and lost his sons in the Kargil war.

Episode 62: During the art class, students discuss the art of making love. Mazhar and Nonie plan to make love. Both get apprehensive and take suggestions from their friends. Nonie reaches Mazhar's place but all their plans fail as Mazhar's mother suddenly arrives. Later Nonie makes Mazhar understand that she is not ready for it and Mazhar supports her decision.

Episode 63: John bursts crackers in the school toilet. Everyone knows that only John could do this but Mona defends John and tells the principal that John is innocent. Mona gets shocked when she finds the crackers in John's bag and complains about him to the principal. John gets suspended from school for a week. This creates a major rift between John and Mona.

Episode 64: The school arranges a camp for the 12th class students before their terminal examination. Everyone is very excited to go to the camp. But Mehul decides not to go for the camp as he does not have funds. Raghav and others plan to raise funds for Mehul. Kiran's mother does not permit her to go for the camp but Kiran manages to forge her mother's signatures and decides to go. Raghav lies to Mehul that the school is paying for.

Episode 65: Everyone is excited about reaching the camp. Raghav reveals the truth to Mehul that his payment was made by Vinny Sir and Chandragupta Sir. Everyone knows that Raghav is brave but they are unaware of the fact that he has a phobia of heights. Vinny Sir gets very upset about knowing that Kiran has forged her mother's signatures. Kiran's mother reaches the camp to take her back but Vinny Sir makes her understand. John tries in vain to speak to Mona. But she still has not forgiven him.

Episode 66: Nonie tries to solve the misunderstanding between John and Mona. Raghav overcomes his fear of heights and tries paragliding. Kiran apologizes to her mother and convinces her to let her stay at the camp. Finally Mona and John resolve their misunderstandings and get back together. Everyone returns home after having much fun at the camp.

Episode 67: Yadav Sir is made the acting principal of the school in absence of Mrs. Rodriquez. Yadav Sir warns all the students to behave obediently. All the students get irritated by Yadav Sir's tyranny. Even the teachers oppose his manners and ask him to cut down on his stern approach towards the students. Finally, Yadav Sir realizes his mistake and all the students get elated by the sudden change in Yadav Sir's behavior.

Episode 68: Kiran and other girls go out for shopping when some rowdy boys harass them. Kiran decides to learn driving and takes out the car without her mother's permission. Cyrus who himself doesn't have a driving license teaches Kiran to drive. Kiran asks her friends to come for a drive with her. Everyone except for Prishita refuses to go with her. Kiran drives the car and Cyrus and Prishita go along with her. But once again the same boys come and start bothering them. Kiran loses her control over the car and hits a man with it. The police come and arrest Kiran, Cyrus, and Prishita for not having license and driving negligently.

Episode 69: Kiran's mother gets really worried as she has not returned home. Mona informs Kiran's mother that she has taken the car. Kiran, Cyrus, and Prishita are at the police station. Cyrus informs Vinny Sir about it. Vinny Sir along with Mehul goes to visit the man who has got injured in the accident and requests him to take back his complaint. Kiran's mother reaches the police station and finally, they are bailed out. Kiran goes to the hospital to meet the man and apologizes to him.

Episode 70: All the 12th class students are very excited about the field trip but Yadav Sir cancels their field trip. All the students decide to protest against it and do mass bunking. Only Meera and Mehul attend Yadav Sir's class test. Vinny Sir and Yadav Sir decide to teach all of them a lesson and inform their parents about the mass bunking. The next day in school, everyone gets shocked to see that they have failed in the class test. They all apologize to Yadav Sir and request him to conduct the test once again for them. Finally, Yadav Sir forgives them and also informs them that they will be going for a field trip.

Episode 71: Students decide to make an advertisement to promote their Each One Teach One campaign. They approach a model for this but she ditches them at the last minute. They all get disappointed but then Supermodel Milind Soman comes to their rescue. Milind does the ad for them and everyone gets impressed by his simplicity.

Episode 72: Everyone discusses arrange marriages and Prishita is startled upon learning that her parents have already fixed her marriage. Prishita is disturbed and discusses it with Vinny Sir. Prishita meets the guy with whom her parents have fixed her marriage and cleverly handles the situation. Prishita learns that even he doesn't wish to marry her as he loves someone else. Prishita makes her parents understand that she has to make a career before thinking of marriage.

Episode 73: Nonie goes for an art exhibition and befriends a girl named Maya. Nonie become fond of Maya and starts hanging around with her. Maya has a habit of shoplifting and Nonie too develops the same habit. Nonie along with her friends of DeNobili and Maya goes to a shopping mall. Nonie steals a purse and puts it in Samanthas bag. But the burglar alarm rings and they all get caught. Maya calls up her father and he comes to rescue them all. Everyone thinks that it is Maya who shoplifted but is surprised when Nonie admits that she had stolen the purse.

Episode 74: Nonie feels extremely guilty about her behavior. She goes to meet Maya and Maya makes her understand that their lives are completely different and they can't be together. Everyone understands Nonie. Alisha is very upset as her parents inform her that they have to shift to Delhi and she has to go back to her previous school, Whitehall. Alisha doesn't wish to part from Rafey. Alisha tells everyone that she is going back. Rafey breaks down on knowing this.

Episode 75: Alisha doesn't wish to leave DeNobili. Her friends try to convince her father to let Alisha stay back but in vain. Rafey is upset. Vinny Sir makes Alisha understand that she should move ahead in life. Finally, Alisha makes up her mind and agrees to go. There is a farewell party for Alisha. Rafey and Alisha are heartbroken to part.

Episode 76: Everyone decides to do a play named Romeo Juliet at the annual day function. Everyone is excited and prepares for the audition. Prishita desperately wants to play the role of Juliet. Prishita thinks that Kiran is the only tough competitor and hence misinforms her about the auditions. Later, Prishita feels guilty about it and convinces Vinny Sir to give a chance to Kiran to take part in the auditions. Kiran gives her best but everyone gets shocked as Meera comes for the audition. Everyone is surprised her performance. Kiran feels bad as Meera is selected to play Juliet.

Episode 77: The preparations for annual day are going on in full swing. Finally, Kiran too joins everyone and helps in the backstage activities. Everyone observes that Alakhnanda Maam is upset with Vinny Sir and try to resolve their misunderstandings. Everyone is very nervous as well as excited at the Annual Day Function but together they all set the stage on fire with their electrifying performances.

Episode 78: Everyone is very stressed about the board examinations. Cyrus is over-stressed and even tries to commit suicide because of his family pressures. John and all others make him understand and all help each other in preparing for the exams. Amidst all the exam fever Vinny Sir confesses his love to Alakhnanda ma'am and both decide to get married. Everyone gets elated on knowing that their favorite teachers have decided to tie the knot.

Episode 79: Vinny sir and Alakhnanda Ma'am get married. All the students of the school are also invited with Cyrus acting as Vinny sir's Best Man. Soon after the wedding ceremony, Alakhnanda Ma'am goes into labor and gives birth to a daughter.

Episode 80: All the 12th class students of DeNobili are sad and feel terrible as it is time for their farewell. Everyone remembers all the happy and sad moments spent together in the past year. At the farewell function, they are sad to part. The teachers wish them luck for their future and tell them that they will miss them. The 12th class students of DeNobili celebrate their last day in school. Vinny and Alakhnanda remember them as the best batch of DeNobili even after 17 years, when their own daughter is ready for her farewell in the school.

Remake
The show was remade to Ekta Kapoor's video on demand platform ALTBalaji after sixteen years on 12 July 2017 titled Class of 2017 with new cast and story and its sequel series Class of 2020 on 4 February 2020.

References

External links
Official Site at ZeeTv.com
IMDB Cast

Indian television soap operas
Zee TV original programming
1998 Indian television series debuts
2001 Indian television series endings
1990s high school television series
2000s high school television series
Indian teen drama television series
Television series about teenagers
UTV Television